"Hail to the Commanders" (HTTC) is the fight song of the Washington Commanders, an American football team belonging to the National Football League (NFL). At home games, the song is performed by the Washington Commanders Marching Band when the team scores a touchdown. Composed in 1937, the song was performed as "Hail to the Redskins" until 2019, when the team retired the controversial Redskins name. 

The music was composed by Barnee Breeskin with lyrics written by Corinne Griffith, the wife of franchise founder George Preston Marshall. The musical arrangement and lyrics have since gone through various revisions.

History
In 1937, Marshall moved the team from Boston to Washington, D.C. With this move and the introduction of his team to the nation's capital, Marshall commissioned a 110-member marching band to provide the new fans with the "pomp and circumstance" and "pageantry" of a public victory parade. Marshall said he wanted his team and their games to emulate the spectacle of gladiators at the Colosseum.  He also wanted to incorporate elements of the college football experience into the pro game. He outfitted the band with $25,000 worth of uniforms and instruments and asked the band leader, Barnee Breeskin, to compose a fight song worthy of such a team of gladiators and warriors.

The original lyrics were written by Marshall's wife Corinne Griffith to reflect the Native American warrior imagery of the team as the "Redskins". The lyrics were later reworked to be less offensive to contemporary sensibilities, although the Redskins name became increasingly criticized as a racial slur. Washington began playing the song at home games for the 1938 season. "Hail to the Redskins" is the second oldest fight song for a professional American football team; the oldest fight song is "Go! You Packers! Go!", composed in 1931 for the Green Bay Packers.

Revisions
The first revisions, in 1965, removed lyrical and musical references to Dixie. The song's original first stanza ended with the line "Fight for old Dixie", while early arrangements of the song closed to the opening of the southern folk song "Dixie" played as a countermelody.

The Redskins played south of the Mason-Dixon line, and as there were no established NFL teams in the region until the 1960s, Marshall aggressively marketed his franchise as "Team of the South". He would recruit players from Southern schools, feature Southern bands at halftime, and sign contracts to feature the team on Southern radio networks and television networks. In July 1965, a Black Washington fan wrote to the owner of the team, describing the racial unrest that "Dixie" caused and asking for it to be stopped. According to an article in The Washington Afro-American of October 23, 1965, "Dixie" was no longer played as a countermelody starting that year.

In 1972, the lyrics were altered after representatives of Native American groups raised concerns about lines that referred to the practice of scalping and used non-standard grammar in a stereotype of Native American speech:
Scalp ’em, swamp ’um
We will take ’um big score 
Read ’um, Weep ’um,
Touchdown! — We want heap more

Team president Edward Bennett Williams met with a delegation of Native Americans representatives, including Dennis Banks from the American Indian Movement; LaDonna Harris, president of Americans for Indian Opportunity; and Leon Cole, president of the National Congress of American Indians.  They asked him to replace the team nickname, retire the female "Redskinette" dancers in pseudo-native dress, and change the lyrics to the fight song.  Williams listened to their concerns, but in the end he only changed the song lyrics, saying, "The swamp 'ems, scalp 'ems and heap 'ems is a mockery of dialect. We won’t use those lyrics anymore." 

In 2022, more lyrics were changed to reflect the franchise's rebranding as the Commanders, with "Fight for our Commanders" replacing "Braves on the Warpath" as the result of an online fan vote.

Dallas Cowboys incident 
When the NFL began considering expansion to Texas, Marshall strongly opposed the move, as it would end his three-decade monopoly on pro football in the South. In 1958, potential owner Clint Murchison, who was trying to bring the NFL back to Dallas, bought the rights to "Hail to the Redskins" from a disgruntled Breeskin and threatened to prevent Marshall from playing it at games. Marshall agreed to back Murchison's bid, Murchison gave him back the rights to the song, and the Dallas Cowboys were born.

Other usage
The LG Twins of the Korea Baseball Organization use the song's melody in their own fight song.

References

External links

Washington Redskins
Washington Commanders
National Football League fight songs
Football songs and chants
1937 songs
Race-related controversies in music